Hannes Eder (born 5 September 1983) is an Austrian football player.

Honours
 Austrian Football Bundesliga winner: 2008.

External links
 

1983 births
Living people
Austrian footballers
Austrian expatriate footballers
Austria international footballers
SK Rapid Wien players
SønderjyskE Fodbold players
SC Rheindorf Altach players
Expatriate men's footballers in Denmark
Association football defenders